The following is a list of tribes which dwelled and states which existed on the territories of contemporary Belarus, Russia, and Ukraine.

Overview 
Clan cultures of the Stone Age and Bronze Age, up to the Late Antiquity period of the tribal societies that were replaced or incorporated into the Early Slavs. The Slavs were a diverse group of tribal societies in the Iron Age and Migration Age Europe whose tribal organizations created the foundations for today's Slavic nations.

The tribes were later replaced or consolidated by states containing a mixture of Slavs, Varangians and Finno-Ugric groups, starting with the formation of Kievan Rus'. When Kievan Rus' gradually disintegrated in the 12th and 13th centuries, in part by the Mongol invasion of Kievan Rus', its constituent principalities, known historiographically as "Rus' principalities", asserted their autonomy or sovereignty. This included semi-autonomous Rus' principalities in the southwest dependent on the Grand Duchy of Lithuania (and later absorbed into Polish–Lithuanian Commonwealth, such as Halych (Galicia) and Volhynia) and in the northeast long dependent on the Golden Horde until around 1500 (including the Novgorod Republic, Vladimir-Suzdal, Smolensk, Polotsk, and Turov, and later Tver, Moscow (Muscovy) and Nizhny Novgorod-Suzdal). In traditional historiography on Russia, Ukraine and Belarus, the impact of Turco-Mongol rule by the Golden Horde and its successor states (traditionally called the "Tatar yoke" or "Mongol yoke") has been neglected or downplayed, with Imperial Russian historiography of the 18th century expressing European superiority over Muslims, nomads, and Asians, of the 19th century expressing racist and colonialist ideologies, and around 1900 expressing Great Russian chauvinism towards minorities. 20th-century Soviet and Western scholars have sought to give a more balanced perspective, but were still influenced by earlier Imperial Russian literature and their own biases.

From around the late 14th century, Muscovy would gradually dominate and absorb the northeastern Rus' principalities, while competing with Lithuania (and Poland), Novgorod, Tver, and the Teutonic Order for political, socio-economic and cultural control of the entire region. Muscovy became the Tsardom of Russia in 1547, followed by the Russian Empire in 1721, which conquered and annexed the southwestern former Rus' territories from Poland–Lithuania, the Cossack Hetmanate and the Crimean Khanate during the reign of Catherine the Great. 

After World War I, the Russian Civil War and the Polish–Soviet War, most of these areas were part of the Soviet Union during the interwar period, except for the western territories that were part of the Second Polish Republic or other states. During the Cold War, all of Belarus, Russia and Ukraine were part of the Soviet Union as three of its fifteen constituent republics, becoming independent upon its dissolution in 1991.

List

Gallery

See also 
 Outline of Slavic history and culture
 List of Slavic studies journals
 List of historic states of Italy
 List of historic states of Germany
 List of ancient Slavic peoples
 Mythical founders
 Kyi, Shchek and Khoryv
 Lech, Czech, and Rus'
 Rurik, Sineus and Truvor
 Upper Oka Principalities

Notes

References

Bibliography 
  (e-book).
 
  (digital printing 2004)

History of the Rus' people
Russia history-related lists
East Slavic states
East Slavic
Belarus-related lists